Jamaat-ul-Muslimeen (Arabic/Urdu: جماعة المسلمين‎), literally translated as "Group or party of Muslims", is a Pakistani religious organization. Based in Karachi, Sindh, Pakistan, it was founded by Masood Ahmad in January 1962. The present leader of the organization is Muhammad Ishtiaq who became the ameer after the death of Masood Ahmed in 1997. 

Jamaat-ul-Muslimeen closely resembles the Ahl-i Hadith sect in their insistence upon the primary sources of an original monotheistic Islam and a total rejection of fiqh.

Criticism by Sunnis

Sunni scholars accuse Jamaat al-Muslimeen of misinterpreting certain Qur'anic texts and hadiths. They assert that the founder Masood Ahmad expressed his personal opinions, overlooking the works and understandings of other mainstream Muslim scholars. They also charge the Jamaat with takfir, i.e., considering all other Muslims, outside the organization, to be Kafirs or unbelievers.

Publications
 Soam-ul-Muslimeen — by Masood Ahmed (B.Sc.)	
 Zakat-ul-Muslimeen — by Masood Ahmed (B.Sc.) 	
 Hajj-ul-Muslimeen — by Masood Ahmed (B.Sc.) 	
 Zehan Parasti — by Masood Ahmed (B.Sc.) 	
 Minhaj ul Muslimeen — by Masood Ahmed (B.Sc.) 	
 Talash-e-Haq — by Masood Ahmed (B.Sc.) 	
 Tauheed-ul-Muslimeen — by Masood Ahmed (B.Sc.) 	
 At-Tehqeeq Fi Jawab At-Taqleed — by Masood Ahmed (B.Sc.) 	
 Burhan-ul-Muslimeen — by Masood Ahmed (B.Sc.) 	
 Da'awat-ul-Muslimeen — by Masood Ahmed (B.Sc.) 	 	 	
 Salat-ul-Muslimeen — by Masood Ahmed (B.Sc.) 	
 Tafheem-e-Islam — by Masood Ahmed (B.Sc.) 	
 Taareekh-e-Mutawwal — by Masood Ahmed (B.Sc.) 	 	
 Tareekh-e-Islam — by Masood Ahmed (B.Sc.) 	
 Tafseer-e-Quran (10 volumes) — by Masood Ahmed (B.Sc.)

References

Islamic organisations based in Pakistan
Islamic organizations established in 1962